The Sony Action Cam is a series of video-recording devices made by Sony, intended for capturing video while practicing sports.

The lineup currently comprises:

 HDR-AS10: a 170º FOV camera featuring 1080p 30 FPS video, 720p slow motion up to 120 FPS or 1080p at 60 FPS. It features a Carl Zeiss Vario-Tessar lens and Exmor R CMOS sensor and BIONZ image processor with SteadyShot image stabilization. It offers a micro HDMI port and micro SD card slot.
 HDR-AS15: Compared to the AS10, adds external microphone jack, stereo microphones and Wi-Fi connectivity.
 HDR-AS20
 HDR-AS30V
 HDR-AS50 - Capable of full HD at 60 FPS, 120 FPS slow motion and 4K time lapse
 HDR-AS100V
 HDR-AS200V - Capable of full HD at 60 FPS
 HDR-AS300
 HDR-AZ1
 FDR-X1000V: Capable of 4K at 30 FPS
 FDR-X3000: Capable at 4K 30fps 100 Mbps recording. Features Sony's own Balanced Optical SteadyShot also featured in the AS300.

References

External links
 Official website

Sony camcorders